Elio Bertocchi (16 September 1919 – 27 August 1971) was an Italian racing cyclist. He rode in the 1947 Tour de France.

References

External links
 

1919 births
1971 deaths
Italian male cyclists
Sportspeople from Ferrara
Cyclists from Emilia-Romagna